Qaleh Abdollah (also Romanized as Qal‘eh ‘Abdollāh) is a village in Kharqan Rural District, Bastam District, Shahrud County, Semnan Province, Iran. At the 2006 census, its population was 116, in 35 families.

References 

Populated places in Shahrud County